Nerimbera is a rural locality in the Livingstone Shire, Queensland, Australia.

Geography 
The northern part of Nerimbera comprises the Black Creek valley running up into the Berserker Range; this land is mountainous and undeveloped.

The southern part of Nerimbera is bounded to the west by the Fitzroy River and is mostly flatter land (apart from some mountain spurs). Most of the land use in Nerimbera occurs in these low-lying flatter areas and is mostly used for grazing.

The Rockhampton–Emu Park Road runs through from west to east.

History 
The Berserker Range and Mount Berserker takes their name from the Norse Berserker warriors. The name was used in 1853 by pastoralist Charles Archer whose family lived in Scotland and Norway.

In 1911 a Baptist Church opened in Nerimbera. A stump-capping ceremony was held on Saturday 19 August 1911. It opened on Sunday 1 October 1911.

Nerimbera State School opened on 16 August 1921. It was mothballed on 31 December 2008 and closed on 31 December 2009. The school was located at 4 Graff Road (corner Nerimbera School Road).

In the 2011 census, Nerimbera had a population of 265 people.

Heritage listings 
Nerimbera has the following heritage listings:
 St Christophers Chapel Road: St Christophers Chapel

Economy
Employing more than 500 staff, the JBS Meat Processing facility on St Christopher's Chapel Road has a daily processing capacity of 696 cattle. Holcim Australia operate an aggregate quarry at Arnold Drive.

Education 
There are no schools in Nerimbera. The nearest primary school is Lakes Creek State School in neighbouring Lakes Creek to the north-west. The nearest secondary school is North Rockhampton State High School in Frenchville to the north-west.

References

Shire of Livingstone
Localities in Queensland